Karen Jennings (born 1969 or 1970) is an American former basketball player who played with the Nebraska Cornhuskers women's basketball between 1990 and 1993 and set the record for the most career points for Nebraska with 2,405 points. She was the recipient of the 1993 Wade Trophy and was inducted into the University of Nebraska Athletics Hall of Fame in 2013. Outside of college basketball, Jennings worked in sports medicine for the Methodist Hospital between 1998 and 2002. Since 2002 she has been a 
real estate agent in Omaha, Nebraska.

Early life and education
In 1970, Jennings was born in Persia, Iowa. During her childhood, she was diagnosed with scoliosis and started playing basketball. For her post-secondary education, Jennings graduated from the University of Nebraska in 1993 with a Bachelor of Science specializing in exercise physiology. She later attended the University of Nebraska Medical Center for a Master of Science in physical therapy and obtained her master's in 1998.

Career
While at Nebraska, Jennings played on the Nebraska Cornhuskers women's basketball team from 1990 to 1993. As a forward with the Cornhuskers, Jennings scored 2,405 points and set the record for most career points at Nebraska. Jenning's jersey was retired after she completed her studies at Nebraska in 1993. After leaving Nebraska, Jennings played basketball in France from 1993 to 1994 before ending her basketball career to work in physical therapy. After basketball, Jennings worked at the Methodist Hospital between 1998 and 2002 in the sports medicine department. In 2002, Jennings went on to become a real estate agent in Omaha, Nebraska.

Awards and honors
Jennings was the 1993 Wade Trophy recipient and inducted into the University of Nebraska Athletics Hall of Fame in 2013.

Personal life
Jennings is married and has one child.

References

Date of birth missing (living people)
Living people
All-American college women's basketball players
American real estate brokers
American sports physicians
American women's basketball players
Basketball players from Iowa
Nebraska Cornhuskers women's basketball players
People from Harrison County, Iowa
Year of birth missing (living people)